Dineke de Groot is the president of the Supreme Court of Netherlands since November 2020 and the first female to serve in the capacity.

She became a justice of the Supreme Court under the civil and tax law since 2012. She joined the judiciary in 1990 after judiciary training and was moved to the Amsterdam District Court in 1996. She was a member of the Arnhem Court of Appeal in 2009 and as counsel until she was made the vice president of the Supreme Court in January 2018. Although, she was an extraordinary professor of jurisprudence and conflict resolution in the Vrije Universiteit Amsterdam during 2011.

She holds a bachelor's degree of law in Vrije Universiteit Amsterdam and also for arts in the Vienna University.

References 

Living people
1965 births
Dutch women lawyers
20th-century Dutch judges
People from Amsterdam
Presidents of the Supreme Court of the Netherlands
Supreme Court of the Netherlands justices
Vrije Universiteit Amsterdam alumni
University of Vienna alumni
21st-century Dutch judges